Brit Sandaune (born 5 June 1972) is a Norwegian footballer and pre-school teacher. She is originally from the rural area of Skatval in the municipality of Stjørdal, Nord-Trøndelag, and is educated in economy and administration. Brit is today settled in Trondheim with her cohabitant Roy Nilsen.

Football
Brit Sandaune has (per 2001) won six league championships and seven Norwegian national championship (with Trondheims-Ørn SK) in women's soccer.  She is an Olympic Gold and Bronze medallist.

Sandaune played 120 international matches for Norway, scoring nine goals.  With the Norway team she went to the Olympic Games in 1996 in Atlanta, winning Bronze.  Four years later at the Sydney Olympics she won Gold with the Norwegian team. In July 2002 Brit reached 100 matches played for the A-team. She got the Fair Play prize in woman soccer in 2000.

At club level Sandaune played a record 507 matches for Trondheims-Ørn, winning the Norwegian cup competition eight times and the Toppserien league seven times between 1993 and 2003.

External links
 Profile on Tronheim-Ørn

Norwegian women's footballers
1972 births
Living people
Olympic gold medalists for Norway
Olympic bronze medalists for Norway
Medalists at the 1996 Summer Olympics
Footballers at the 1996 Summer Olympics
Medalists at the 2000 Summer Olympics
Footballers at the 2000 Summer Olympics
Olympic footballers of Norway
FIFA Century Club
Olympic medalists in football
Toppserien players
SK Trondheims-Ørn players
Norway women's international footballers
Women's association footballers not categorized by position
2003 FIFA Women's World Cup players
1999 FIFA Women's World Cup players